The discography of Disciplina Kičme / Disciplin A Kitschme, a Serbian alternative rock band from Belgrade, formed in 1982, consists of nine studio albums, one live album, two extended plays, two compilation albums, six singles, and a live DVD video release. The band also appeared on several various artists compilations and recorded several promotional music videos. The band lineup frequently changed throughout the releases clustering around the band frontman Dušan Kojić, also known as "Koja", "Zeleni Zub", "Black Tooth" and "Crni Zub" as he often appears on the band releases. Since 1995, the band started using an alternative name, Disciplin A Kitschme, and since the year, all the band releases, except the reissues of the released Disciplina Kičme material, were signed with the alternative band name.

Studio albums

Live albums

Compilation albums

Singles

Box sets

Video albums

Other appearances

References 
 EX YU ROCK enciklopedija 1960-2006, Janjatović Petar; 
 Disciplina Kičme discography at Discogs
 Disciplin A Kitschme discography at Discogs
 Disciplina Kičme at Youtube
 Disciplin A Kitschme at Youtube

Discographies of Serbian artists
Rock music group discographies